Nikolaos "Nikos" Stamatakos (born 1 January 1992) is a Greek professional footballer who plays as a forward for Gamma Ethniki club Ethnikos Piraeus.

Career

Early years
Stamatakos began his football career in Eretria Academy. He played for his hometown club Apollon Eretria in the Euboea Football Clubs Association A1 Division during the 2009−10 season, achieving top-scorer honors. He then moved to AO Chalkida in 2010, at the time playing in the Delta Ethniki, the fourth tier of the Greek football league system. Aged 19, Stamatakos played a total of 1328 minutes in which he scored 1 goal and had 1 assist. He returned to Apollon in 2011, where he played for three seasons in local competitions, each finishing as his club's top-scorer. His feats drew the attention of Greek second Division side Kallithea, who signed him in 2014.

Senior career
Stamatakos made 4 league appearances for Kallithea during the 2014−15 season. He was given on loan to Gamma Ethniki side AO Chalkida in 2015, returning to the Euboea-based club after 4 years in order to get more playing time. Stamatakos  excelled during the 2015–16 Gamma Ethniki, scoring 11 goals in 23 league appearances and another 6 in the Euboea FCA Cup, once again earning club season top-scorer honors. He returned to Kallithea for the 2016−17 season. He scored two goals vs. eventual Division champions Apollon Smyrni during the 2016–17 season opener, a thrilling 3−2 away loss. He followed up with another goal during an impressive 1−0 Kallithea victory over Superleague side Atromitos in the 2016–17 Greek Football Cup. In total, Stamatakos played in 31 league games and scored 6 goals for Kallithea, making a significant contribution to his club's narrow escape of relegation, and which once again made him club season top-scorer.

In August 2017, Stamatakos terminated his contract with Kallithea. A few weeks later, he signed a contract with fellow Football League side Ergotelis, rejoining his former coach at Kallithea, Takis Gonias. He scored his first goal for Ergotelis in November 2017, during a 2−3 home loss vs. title contenders Aris. He had a significant contribution to his club's offensive game, leading his team in assists (10), and having scored 7 times in 30 league appearances. 

In the summer of 2018, Stamatakos left Ergotelis to join fellow Football League side Trikala.

Club statistics

References

External links
 

1992 births
Living people
Greek footballers
Kallithea F.C. players
Ergotelis F.C. players
Trikala F.C. players
Association football wingers
People from Eretria